The 2011 AFC President's Cup was the seventh edition of the AFC President's Cup, a football competition organized by the Asian Football Confederation (AFC) for clubs from "emerging countries" in Asia.

Teams from 12 member associations competed. In the qualifying stage, the 12 teams were divided into three groups of four teams each, and the top two teams from each group qualified for the six-team finals to be played at a centralised venue. In the final stage, the qualified six teams were divided into two groups of three teams each. The winners from each group met in the final for the title.

TaiPOWER FC became the first Taiwanese team to win the AFC President's Cup with a 3–2 win over Phnom Penh Crown from Cambodia in the final.

Venues

Qualifying teams
Palestinian Authority clubs began to play in the AFC President's Cup from 2011 onwards.

Group stage

The draw for the group stage was held on 14 March 2011, 15:00 UTC+08:00, at AFC House, Kuala Lumpur. The 12 teams were divided into three groups of four teams each. The group matches were scheduled to be played from 13 to 31 May 2011; however, matches of Group C were played from 20 to 24 April 2011.

All groups were played in a single round-robin format at a centralized venue. The top two teams from each group qualified for the final stage. The clubs are ranked according to points and tie breakers are in following order:
Greater number of points obtained in the group matches between the teams concerned;
Goal difference resulting from the group matches between the teams concerned;
Greater number of goals scored in the group matches between the teams concerned;
Goal difference in all the group matches;
Greater number of goals scored in all the group matches;
Kicks from the penalty mark if only two teams are involved and they are both on the field of play;
Fewer score calculated according to the number of yellow and red cards received in the group matches; (1 point for each yellow card, 3 points for each red card as a consequence of two yellow cards, 3 points for each direct red card, 4 points for each yellow card followed by a direct red card)
Drawing of lots.

Group A 

All matches were held in Cambodia.
All times are Indochina Time (ICT) – UTC+07:00

Group B 

All matches were held in Myanmar.
All times are Myanmar Standard Time (MST) – UTC+06:30

Group C 

All matches were held in Nepal.
All times are Nepal Time (NPT) – UTC+05:45

Final stage
On 14 June 2011, the Organising Committee for the AFC President's Cup decided to award the hosting rights of the 2011 AFC President's Cup Finals to Chinese Taipei. The matches were played at the Kaohsiung National Stadium in Kaohsiung from 19 to 25 September 2011.

The draw for the final stage was held on 29 July 2011, 16:00 UTC+08:00, at AFC House, Kuala Lumpur. The six teams which qualified for the final stage were divided into two groups of three teams each, played in a single round-robin format. The winner from each group qualified for the single-match final to decide the title (extra time and penalty shootout would be used to decide the winner if necessary).

All matches were held in Taiwan (Republic of China).
All times are Taiwan Standard Time (TST) – UTC+08:00

Group A

Group B

Final

Awards
The following awards were given for the 2011 AFC President's Cup:
Most Valuable Player Award:  Chen Po-liang (Taiwan Power Company)
Top Scorer:  Ho Ming-tsan (Taiwan Power Company)
Fair Play Award:  Neftchi Kochkor-Ata

Top scorers

See also
 2011 AFC Champions League
 2011 AFC Cup
 List of sporting events in Taiwan

References

External links
AFC President's Cup Official Page 

3
2011
2011 in Burmese football
2011 in Cambodian football
2011 in Nepalese sport
2011 in Taiwanese football
2011
2011
2011
2011